The HP Envy (stylized as HP ENVY) is a line of consumer-oriented high-end laptops, desktop computers and printers manufactured and sold by HP Inc. They started as a high-end version of the HP Pavilion line.

History
HP originally launched the line on October 15, 2009, with two high-performance models, the Envy 13 and the Envy 15. These models replaced the Voodoo Envy when HP and VoodooPC merged. After that, Hewlett-Packard expanded the series with the addition of the Envy 14 and Envy 17 models. The Envy mainly competes against computers such as Acer's Aspire, Dell's Inspiron and XPS, Lenovo's IdeaPad, Samsung's Sens and Toshiba's Satellite.

In 2010 HP released only 14 and 17 Envy models.

In 2012, HP discontinued their traditional Envy 13, 14, 15 and 17 models by rebranding their Pavilion line of computers as the new Envy lineup. The new Envy line had a starting price of US$499, and consisted of the (rebranded Pavilion) Envy notebook line and the hybrid HP Envy x2.  The rebranded Pavilion laptops continued with Beats Audio branded speakers and dedicated Nvidia graphic processors.

In 2014 the naming changed again, and Envy laptops had a 13, 14, 15 and 17 model.

HP also has branded desktops and printers with the Envy label.

Notebook models
There are three Ultrabooks in the early 2013 Envy lineup – the Envy 4 TouchSmart, Envy 4, and Envy 6.

Current models

Envy x2

The HP Envy x2 refers to two generations of 2-in-1 PCs.
 The first generation Envy x2, introduced in 2012, is a compact laptop-tablet hybrid. It consists of a detachable 11.6-inch screen with a  resolution and active stylus support, together with a keyboard dock equipped with two USB 2.0 ports, a full-size HDMI connector, and a standard SD card slot. The device runs Windows 8 on a 1.8GHz Intel Atom Z2760 processor. It is upgradable to Windows 10 Home, but Microsoft does not support the latest Windows features in the Creators Update due to incompatibility. It will, however, continue receiving security and reliability updates until 2023.
 The second generation Envy x2 was announced in 2017, and is a Windows 10-powered hybrid tablet with a 12.3-inch  display, an included active stylus, and a detachable keyboard attachment not unlike Microsoft's Surface Pro. Touting 20 hours of battery life on a single charge and 4G LTE network capability, there are two processor and operating system options: the ARM-based Snapdragon 835 from Qualcomm with Windows 10 S (and the ability to upgrade to Windows 10 Pro), and seventh-generation Intel Core i-series processors with Windows 10 Home. Physical connectivity on both versions is limited to a single USB-C 3.1 port and a microSD card reader.

Envy 13

The 2009's Envy 13 – uses a mobile  1.86GHz CULV Core 2 Duo processor with 3GB of DDR3 memory and the entry-level ATI Radeon Mobility 4330 graphics. The 13 has a 13.1-inch HP LED Ultra BrightView Infinity display with a  resolution. Available as an upgrade was the highly praised HP Radiance Infinity Display with a  resolution. At launch it had a price of US$1,799, though it has been dropped to $1,299.

2017 model – with an 8th generation Intel Core i7-8565U chip, 16GB of DDR4 RAM, NVIDIA GeForce MX250 dedicated graphics card, and a 512GB SSD, and aluminum chassis.

2020 model – 13.3-inch FHD display, 10th generation Intel Core CPU; 8 GB RAM, 512GB SSD; Dimensions: 307 x 195 x 16.9 mm, Weight: 1.3 kg.

Envy 14

The 2010's Envy 14 has a 14.5" HP BrightView Infinity LED display at a  resolution. It is powered by Intel's Core series of processors and a mid-level ATI Radeon Mobility 5650. The dynamic swapping GPUs are useful when gaming or using graphic demanding programs. The 14 also provides longer battery life with an 8 Cell Li-Ion battery. Unlike the 13 and 15 models, the Envy 14 also comes with a backlit keyboard, a standard Intel Wireless-N Card with Bluetooth and a slot-loading DVD+-R/RW drive. The base price for the Envy 14 is $999. The Envy 14 also comes in a special Beats edition, which is in an all-black design with a red back-lit keyboard, starting at $1,099.

In mid 2011, HP released the 2nd Gen Envy 14, and the basic configuration comes with a 2nd Gen Intel Core i5 @ 2.4GHz and is upgradable up to the quad-core i7 @ 2.3GHz. Standard configurations come with 6GB DDR3 RAM installed, but the system can handle up to 16GB (2 slots). The same backlit keyboard and 8-cell battery comes standard on all laptops, along with the same 8X slot-loading DVD-R/RW drive. The base price of the system remains the same as the first generation, starting at around $999.

HP Envy x360

Envy 15

The Envy 15 uses mobile Intel Core i7 and Core i5 processors (4 and 2 cores respectively) and can hold a maximum of 16GB of RAM housed in 4 DIMM slots (2 of which are user accessible). The 15 makes use of the 40nm ATI Mobility Radeon HD 5830 with 1GB of dedicated graphics memory.

The webcam on the Envy 15 is night-vision capable with infra-red sensor. The Envy 15 is designed to house a single 2.5" Serial ATA drive, or two 1.8" SATA drives, with two 160GB solid state drives configuration available. This model had a price of $1,999 at launch but has been dropped to $1,299. New generation of HP Envy m6 model, called as HP ENVY m6-1225dx release in January, 2013. This model had a price of $699 with a 2.6GHz Intel Core i5-3230M Dual Core processor (up to 3.2GHz via Turbo Boost) and Microsoft Windows 8.

The 15.6" Full HD "Radiance" display panel which was sold with this laptop has an issue in which the color red displays closer to orange. In response, HP had issued a software utility called MyDisplay, but does not appear to completely correct the problem with some users saying all it does is mask a problem which is actually hardware based and not software.

Starting May 2013, HP has released its new line of HP Envy laptops that come with the 4th generation Haswell Core i7 processors. These laptops come with an optional upgrade to Nvidia GT 740M graphic cards with 2GB of dedicated graphics memory. Whether HP uses the GK107 or GK208 variant in the 740M is undisclosed. The laptops also offer a hybrid 1TB hard drive, and the line starts from the price of $799.

Envy 17
The 2010's Envy 17 comes with a Blu-ray option, and, similar to the Envy 14, come equipped with a backlit keyboard. It has also an optional  display resolution, option for dual hard-disk or SSD and Supports Eyefinity by which it can be connected to 3 displays via VGA, Mini DisplayPort, and HDMI out supported by ATI 5850 GDDR5 Graphics.

Envy 17 3D
The Envy 17 comes with all basic features of Envy 17 plus a 3D  display and HP 3D glasses.

The 2020's Envy 17 has a 10gen or 11gen Intel Core CPU and up to GeForce MX330 graphics.

Discontinued models

As of October 2012 the Envy 13, 14, 15, and 17 have been temporary discontinued.  The first of these models was originally released on October 15, 2009. All models have a standard battery that fits in the chassis as well as an optional slice battery that fits below the chassis, in each case promised by HP to more than double the battery life. Both machines are also constructed from layered magnesium and aluminum etched with a subtle design pattern. The slice battery adds about 1.5 inches to the laptop's height and 680g of mass. However, it more than doubles the battery life. The AC adapter is also of considerable size since it must power the laptop and charge both batteries.

Envy Dv5

Envy Dv6
The Envy Dv6 is a 15.6-inch laptop starting at approximately $700–1300 that resembles the previous Pavilion dv6 and is replacement to the successful HP Envy 15. It weighs ~, has a mostly aluminum chassis and can be customized to accommodate a 1080p matte display, multi-touch touchpad, and up to 1.5TB HDD. The HP Envy Dv6 runs Windows 8 and can be configured to have an Up to Nvidia GTX 650M graphics, backlit keyboard and comes with Beats audio. There are two main variants of the Dv6, the Dv6 comes with AMD processors while the Dv6t come with Intel Core i7 Mobile processors.

In November 2015, HP released a new Envy Dv6. It accommodates a FHD display and 1.5TB HDD. The new Dv6 comes with Windows 10 and can be configured with up to an Intel Core i7 processor, Nvidia GeForce GT900M graphics and a "lifted" hinge design. It also comes with B&O Play.

Envy Dv7

For 2013 the series are now named Envy 17t. Intel Haswell (Lynx Point) processors are offered with Intel HD 4600 graphics, and optional Nvidia GT 740M graphics along with Blu-ray optical drives.

The Envy Dv7 is a high-end 17.3-inch laptop priced at ~US$800–1600 (depending on the configuration) that resembles the previous Pavilion Dv7. It weighs ≈ and can be customized to accommodate a matte  TN LCD display, multi-touch touch pad, and can hold two hard drives (up to 1TB each when purchased from HP). The HP Envy Dv7 runs Windows 8 and is replacement to the successful HP Envy 17. The Dv7 can be configured to have an Intel Core i7 Mobile processor, up to Nvidia GT 650M graphics and a backlit keyboard. The Dv7 comes with Beats Audio and has an aluminum chassis. There are two main variants of the Dv7, the Dv7z has AMD processors while the Dv7t come with more powerful Intel processors.

Envy 14 Spectre
The Envy 14 Spectre is a 14-inch ultrabook starting at US$1399.99. It weighs four pounds and includes a radiance display, a gorilla glass screen and palm rest, a buttonless multi-touch touchpad, an NFC chip and solid-state drive. The HP Envy 14 Spectre runs Windows 7.
The 14 Spectre was removed from HP's 2013 Envy lineup as the Spectre line was spun off from it.

Envy Spectre XT
The Envy Spectre XT is a 13-inch ultrabook starting at US$999.99, released in 2012 and removed from HP's 2013 Envy lineup. It weighs  and includes a  display, buttonless multi-touch touchpad, and solid-state drive. The HP Envy Spectre XT runs Windows 7.
Envy Spectre XT Pro
Same model with Tpm module and windows 7 Pro.

Desktop models
There have been several series of Envy desktops, including Envy H8, Envy 700, Envy H9, Envy Phoenix 800, Envy Phoenix 860 and Envy Phoenix H9. A wide variety of features differentiate the individual models. As a result, they range from mainstream through gamer-oriented.

All-in-One desktop models
This line includes the ENVY 32, ENVY 34 Curved and ENVY 27 All-in-One PCs.

Printers 
There are many all-in-one printers with the Envy brand, including Envy 100, Envy 110, Envy 120, Envy 4500, Envy 4520 and Envy 5530. HP continues to bring out new printers for the Envy brand with over 50 models now in circulation.

HP ENVY i7 X360.

External links

 HP Envy website
 HP Envy 4 1046tx Review by Vinzit.com, 25 Jul 2012
 HP Envy Touchsmart

HP laptops
Consumer electronics brands
2-in-1 PCs
Ultrabooks
Computer-related introductions in 2020